David Mickey Evans (born October 20, 1962) is an American film director and screenwriter. His films tend to focus on children and the challenges of childhood. A baseball fan, Evans directed and co-wrote The Sandlot (1993).

Life and career
Evans was born in Wilkes-Barre, Pennsylvania in 1962. In 1980 he moved to Los Angeles for college. He attended Loyola Marymount University and graduated with a film degree in 1984. He got his start writing action-thriller films, but found his niche in the 1990s with family-oriented films that appealed to adults, children and critics alike.

He became one of the highest paid screenwriters during this time, selling the screenplays to both Radio Flyer and The Sandlot for over $1,000,000 each.  Radio Flyer was originally to be directed by Evans, but he was replaced by Richard Donner due to his inexperience.  Reshoots followed after poor test screenings and the film budget jumped from $15,000,000 to $30,000,000.  The original script called for more fantasy sequences involving a worm man and zombies but these ideas were scrapped when Richard Donner replaced Evans.  Radio Flyer opened to mostly mixed reviews from critics while The Sandlot received much more positive reviews and better box office results.

Success for Evans became fleeting by the late 1990s, with films like First Kid and Ed bombing with critics and at the box office. Evans switched to more adult-oriented humor and material with After School Special, but didn't fare much better. Since then, he has written and directed numerous made-for-T.V. and direct-to-DVD films, including The Sandlot 2, the sequel to the popular film The Sandlot.

Filmography

References

External links

1962 births
Living people
Loyola Marymount University alumni
20th-century male writers
American male screenwriters
Writers from Wilkes-Barre, Pennsylvania
Film directors from Pennsylvania
Screenwriters from Pennsylvania